J. Thomas Shipp and Abraham S. Smith were young African-American men who were murdered in a spectacle lynching by a mob of thousands on August 7, 1930, in Marion, Indiana. They were taken from jail cells, beaten, and hanged from a tree in the county courthouse square. They had been arrested that night as suspects in a robbery, murder and rape case. A third African-American suspect, 16-year-old James Cameron, had also been arrested and narrowly escaped being killed by the mob; an unknown woman and a local sports hero intervened, and he was returned to jail. Cameron later stated that Shipp and Smith had committed the murder but that he had run away before that event.

The local chapter of the NAACP had tried, unsuccessfully, to evacuate the suspects from town to avoid the mob violence. The NAACP and the State's Attorney General pressed to indict leaders of the lynch mob, but, as was typical in lynchings, no one was ever charged for their deaths, nor for the attack on Cameron.

Cameron was later convicted and sentenced as an accessory to murder before the fact. He served some time in prison, then pursued work and an education. After dedicating his life to civil rights activism, in 1991 Cameron was pardoned by the state of Indiana.

Incident 
The three suspects had been arrested the night before, charged with robbing and murdering a white factory worker, Claude Deeter, and raping his girlfriend, Mary Ball, who was with him at the time.

A large crowd broke into the jail with sledgehammers, pulled out the three suspects, beating them and hanging them. When Abram Smith tried to free himself from the noose as his body was hauled up, he was lowered and men broke his arms to prevent such efforts. Police officers in the crowd cooperated in the lynching. A third person, 16-year-old James Cameron, narrowly escaped death thanks to an unidentified woman who said that the youth had nothing to do with the rape or murder.

A local studio photographer, Lawrence Beitler, took a photograph of the dead men hanging from a tree surrounded by the large lynch mob; the crowd was estimated at 5,000 and included women and children. He sold thousands of copies of the photograph in the next ten days.

According to Cameron's 1982 memoir, the police had originally accused all three men of murder and rape. After the lynchings, and Mary Ball's testimony, the rape charge was dropped against Cameron. He said in interviews that Shipp and Smith had shot and killed Claude Deeter.

Flossie Bailey, a local NAACP official in Marion, and Attorney General James M. Ogden worked to gain indictments against leaders of the mob in the lynchings, but the Grant County grand jury refused to return an indictment.  Attorney General Ogden then brought charges against four leaders of the mob, as well as bringing impeachment proceedings against the Grant County sheriff who had refused to intervene. All-white Grant County juries returned "not guilty" verdicts for all of the leaders charged.

James Cameron was tried in 1931 as an accessory to murder before the fact, convicted and sentenced to state prison for several years. After being released on parole, he moved to Detroit, where he worked and went to college. In the 1940s he returned to Indiana, working as a civil rights activist and heading a state agency for equal rights. In the 1950s he moved to Milwaukee, Wisconsin. There in 1988 he founded America's Black Holocaust Museum, for African-American history and documentation of lynchings of African Americans.

Legacy 
 The night of the lynching, studio photographer Lawrence Beitler took a photograph of the crowd surrounding the bodies of the two men hanging from a tree. He sold thousands of copies over the next 10 days.
 In 1937 Abel Meeropol, a Jewish schoolteacher from New York City and later the adoptive father of the sons of Julius and Ethel Rosenberg, saw a copy of Beitler's 1930 photograph. Meeropol later said that the photograph "haunted [him] for days" and inspired his poem "Bitter Fruit". It was published in the New York Teacher in 1937 and later in the magazine New Masses, in both cases under the pseudonym Lewis Allan. Meeropol set his poem to music, renaming it "Strange Fruit". He performed it at a labor meeting in Madison Square Garden. In 1939 it was performed, recorded and popularized by American singer Billie Holiday. The song reached 16th place on the charts in July 1939, and has since been recorded by numerous artists, continuing into the 21st century.
 After years as a civil rights activist, in 1988 James Cameron founded and became director of America's Black Holocaust Museum in Milwaukee, Wisconsin, devoted to African-American history in the United States. He intended it as a place for education and reconciliation.
 In 2007, artist David Powers supervised the creation of a mural, titled American Nocturne, in a park in downtown Elgin, Illinois.  The mural depicts the bottom half of the Beitler photograph, showing the crowd at the lynching but not the bodies of Shipp and Smith.  The artwork was intended as a critique of racism in American society. After it had been displayed without controversy for nearly a decade, in 2016 dissension was generated after someone posted images of the mural and lynching photo together on social media, and its origin was seen. The mural was moved from the park to the Hemmens Cultural Center. After hearing public comment, the Elgin Cultural Arts Commission recommended to the city council that the mural be permanently removed from public display. In 2021 the mural was replaced by one inspired by images painted on boarded-up storefronts during protests following George Floyd's murder.

Lawrence Henry Beitler 
Lawrence Henry Beitler (October 9, 1885  March 3, 1960) was the American studio photographer who photographed the hanging bodies of African Americans Thomas Shipp and Abram Smith, surrounded by a large white crowd, including women and children. The photo became an iconic representation of such events. Beitler sold thousands of copies, which he stayed up for 10 days and nights printing.

References

Further reading 

 Allen, James; Hilton Als, et al., Without Sanctuary: Lynching Photography in America (Twin Palms Publishers, 2000). Related website of the same name is listed below.
 Bailey, Amy Kate and Stewart E. Tolnay, Lynched. The Victims of Southern Mob Violence (University of North Carolina Press, 2015). .
 Cameron, James. A Time of Terror: A Survivor’s Story, (Black Classics Press, 1982/reprint 1994).
 Carr, Cynthia, Our Town: A Heartland Lynching, A Haunted Town, and the Hidden History of White America, (Random House, 2007).
 Madison, James. A Lynching in the Heartland: Race and Memory in America (New York: St. Martin's Press, 2000). . online review
 Myrdal, Gunnar. An American Dilemma, (Harper and Brothers, 1944).
 Tolnay, Stewart E. and E. M. Beck, A Festival of Violence: An Analysis of Southern Lynchings, 1882–1930 (Urbana: University of Illinois Press, 1992)
 The Evening Road – Fiction by Laird Hunt 2017

External links 
 "Strange Fruit: Anniversary of A Lynching", National Public Radio, includes larger version of original Beitler photo, showing women in the crowd around the hanging bodies
 James Allen, Without Sanctuary: Photographs and Postcards of Lynching in America, his website related to his published book of same name
 Notes on the photo from Allen's Without Sanctuary, includes a quote from Cameron's A Time of Terror
 American History: "Lynching", Spartacus Educational, includes an account of the origin of poem/song Strange Fruit
 Lynchings & Hangings in American History
 A 2005 interview with James Cameron, the survivor, Milwaukee Journal Sentinel, July 8, 2005. (link may require free registration)

See also 
 , April 2022 lynching of black man in South Africa 
 , 2008 lynching of black man in South Africa
 , longstanding and ongoing lynchings of black people in Tanzania

Year of birth missing
1930 deaths
1930 murders in the United States
People murdered in Indiana
Murdered African-American people
Lynching deaths in Indiana
Racially motivated violence against African Americans
People from Marion, Indiana
Incidents of violence against boys
August 1930 events
African-American history of Indiana
History of racism in Indiana
African-American history between emancipation and the civil rights movement
1930 in Indiana
Prisoners murdered in custody
Anti-black racism in the United States
Grant County, Indiana
Crimes in Indiana
Deaths by person in Indiana